KRYP is a commercial broadcast FM radio station located in the Portland, Oregon area and owned by the Salem Media Group.  KRYP is a Spanish language station playing regional Mexican music (a mix of genres such as Banda, Ranchera, Mariachi, and Norteño).

The Spring 2008 Arbitron ratings saw KRYP become the Portland metropolitan area market leader, marking the first time a Spanish language radio station achieved that milestone.

Facilities
KRYP's studio is in Gladstone, and its main transmitter is atop Portland's West Hills.  The station also has a reservation for Astoria, Oregon at 92.9 MHz.

History
KRYP took on its current callsign and radio format during the two-week period starting on March 28, 2007.  From early 2006 to April 11, 2007, the station was known as KTRO and featured a talk radio format.

KTRO-FM came into existence through a complicated deal that involved five owners of radio stations in Oregon and featured both signal downgrades and frequency migrations. It started in 2005 when Salem Communications bought the FM signal from New Northwest Broadcasters, who had operated it as KAST-FM on 92.9 in Astoria, Oregon. To make room on the Portland dial, KPDQ-FM, also owned by Salem, moved from 93.7 to 93.9 and downgraded its broadcast station class from C to C1. McKenzie River Broadcasting's KKNU, licensed to Springfield, moved from 93.1 to 93.3. Bay Cities Building's KDCQ, licensed to Coos Bay, moved from 93.5 to 92.9.  Meanwhile, Oregon Eagle's KTIL-FM, licensed to Tillamook, moved from 94.1 to 94.3.  New Northwest's own 94.3 licensed to Long Beach, Washington/Astoria, picked up the KAST-FM callsign and format from the original 92.9 to 99.7.

Salem Communication, which normally "target[s] audiences interested in Christian and family-themed content and conservative values", brought in José Santos of Santos Latin Media, former program director of KLVE in Los Angeles, to consult on its change to a Regional Mexican format.

References

External links

Hispanic and Latino American culture in Portland, Oregon
RYP
RYP
Regional Mexican radio stations in the United States
Clackamas County, Oregon
Radio stations established in 1981
1981 establishments in Oregon
Gladstone, Oregon
Salem Media Group properties